Kabakçı can refer to:

 Kabakçı, Kargı
 Kabakçı Mustafa